The Chief of Staff of the Indonesian Air Force (abbreviated KSAU or KASAU) is the highest position in the Indonesian Air Force. The position is held by the four-star Marshal, appointed by and reporting directly to the Commander of the Indonesian National Armed Forces. Chief of Staff is assisted by Vice Chief of Staff of the Indonesian Air Force, position is held by three-star Marshal.

List of officeholders

See also
Commander of the Indonesian National Armed Forces
Chief of Staff of the Indonesian Army
Chief of Staff of the Indonesian Navy

References

Chiefs of Staff of the Indonesian Air Force
Indonesia